Skokie (formerly Niles Center) is a village in Cook County, Illinois, United States, neighboring the City of Chicago's northern border. Its population, according to the 2020 census, was 67,824. Its name comes from a Potawatomi word for "marsh." For many years, Skokie promoted itself as "The World's Largest Village." Skokie's streets, like that of many suburbs, are largely a continuation of the Chicago street grid, and the village is served by the Chicago Transit Authority, further cementing its connection to the city.

Skokie was originally a German-Luxembourger farming community, but was later settled by a sizeable Jewish population, especially after World War II. At its peak in the mid-1960s, 58% of the population was Jewish, the largest proportion of any Chicago suburb. Skokie still has many Jewish residents (now about 30% of the population) and over a dozen synagogues. It is home to the Illinois Holocaust Museum and Education Center, which opened in northwest Skokie in 2009.

Skokie has twice received national attention for court cases decided by the United States Supreme Court. In the mid-1970s, it was at the center of National Socialist Party of America v. Village of Skokie, in which a Nazi group, backed by the American Civil Liberties Union, invoked the First Amendment in an attempt to schedule a Nazi rally in Skokie. At the time, Skokie had a significant population of Holocaust survivors. Skokie ultimately lost that case, though the rally was never held.

History

Beginnings

In 1888, the community was incorporated as Niles Centre. About 1910, the spelling was Americanized to "Niles Center". However, the name caused postal confusion with the neighboring village of Niles. A village-renaming campaign began in the 1930s. In a referendum on November 15, 1940, residents chose the Native American name "Skokie" over the name "Devonshire."

During the real estate boom of the 1920s, large parcels were subdivided; many two- and three-flat apartment buildings were built, with the "Chicago"-style bungalow a dominant architectural specimen. Large-scale development ended as a result of the Great Crash of 1929 and consequent Great Depression. It was not until the 1940s and the 1950s, when parents of the baby boom generation moved their families out of Chicago, that Skokie's housing development began again. Consequently, the village developed commercially, an example being the Old Orchard Shopping Center, currently named Westfield Old Orchard.

During the night of November 27–28, 1934, after a gunfight in nearby Barrington that left two FBI agents dead, two accomplices of notorious 25-year-old bank-robber Baby Face Nelson (Lester Gillis) dumped his bullet-riddled body in a ditch along Niles Center Road adjoining the St. Peter Catholic Cemetery, a block north of Oakton Street in the town.

The first African-American family to move to Skokie arrived in 1961, and open-housing activists helped to integrate the suburb subsequently.

Name
Historic maps named the Skokie marsh as Chewab Skokie, a probable derivation from Kitchi-wap choku, a Potawatomi term meaning "great marsh". Other Indiginuous names include skoutay or scoti, an Algonquian words for "fire". "Skokie Marsh" was used by local botanists, notably Henry Chandler Cowles, as early as 1901. The village name was changed from "Niles Center" to "Skokie" by referendum in 1940. The name change may also have been influenced by James Foster Porter, a Chicago resident, who had explored the "Skoki Valley" in Banff National Park in Canada in 1911 and admired the name; Porter supported the name "Skokie" in the referendum.

Supreme Court rulings
Twice in its history, Skokie has been the focal point of cases before the United States Supreme Court. National Socialist Party of America v. Village of Skokie, 432 U.S. 43 (1977), involved a First Amendment issue. Solid Waste Agency of Northern Cook County (SWANCC) v. U.S. Army Corps of Engineers, 531 U.S. 159 (2001) touched upon the Commerce Clause.

National Socialist Party of America v. Village of Skokie

In 1977 and 1978, Illinois neo-Nazis of the National Socialist Party of America (NSPA) attempted to hold a march in Skokie, far from their headquarters on Chicago's south side. Originally, the neo-Nazis had planned a political rally in Marquette Park in Chicago. The park is located in what was then a predominantly all-white neighborhood, similar to the situation in 1966, when a crowd of 4,000 Marquette Park residents gathered to watch Martin Luther King Jr. lead a march, some waving Confederate flags or throwing bottles, bricks and rocks at the protesters; King was knocked to his knees when struck by a rock. However, the Chicago authorities thwarted the NSPA's plans.

Seeking another free-speech political venue, the NSPA group chose to march on Skokie. Given the many Holocaust survivors living in Skokie, the village's government thought the Nazi march would be disruptive, and refused the NSPA permission to hold the event. The NSPA appealed that decision, and the American Civil Liberties Union interceded on their behalf, in National Socialist Party of America v. Village of Skokie. An Illinois appeals court raised the injunction issued by a Cook County Circuit Court judge, ruling that the presence of the swastika, the Nazi emblem, would constitute deliberate provocation of the people of Skokie. However, the Court also ruled that Skokie's attorneys had failed to prove that either the Nazi uniform or their printed materials, which it was alleged that the Nazis intended to distribute, would incite violence.

Moreover, because Chicago subsequently lifted its Marquette Park political demonstration ban, the NSPA ultimately held its rally in Chicago. The attempted Illinois Nazi march on Skokie was dramatized in the television movie, Skokie, in 1981.  It was satirized in The Blues Brothers movie in 1980.

Migratory bird rule

In 2001, the decision by Skokie and 22 other communities belonging to the Solid Waste Agency of Northern Cook County to use an isolated wetland as a solid waste disposal site resulted in a lawsuit. Ultimately, the case went all the way to the United States Supreme Court, and resulted in an overturn of the federal migratory bird rule.

Geography
The village is bordered by Evanston to the east, Chicago to the southeast and southwest, Lincolnwood to the south, Niles to the southwest, Morton Grove to the west, Glenview to the northwest, and Wilmette to the north.

The village's street circulation is a street-grid pattern, with a major east–west thoroughfare every half mile: Old Orchard Road, Golf Road, Church Street, Dempster Street, Main Street, Oakton Street, Howard Street, and Touhy Avenue.  The major north–south thoroughfares are Skokie Boulevard, Crawford Avenue, and McCormick Boulevard; the major diagonal streets are Lincoln Avenue, Niles Center Road, East Prairie Road and Gross Point Road.

Skokie's north–south streets continue the street names and (house number) grid values of Chicago's north–south streets – with the notable exceptions of Cicero Avenue, which is renamed Skokie Boulevard within Skokie, and Chicago's Pulaski Road retains its original Chicago City name, Crawford Avenue. The east–west streets continue Evanston's street names, but with Chicago grid values, such that Evanston's Dempster Street is 8800 north in Skokie addresses.

Demographics
As of the 2020 census there were 67,824 people, 22,503 households, and 16,206 families residing in the village. The racial makeup of the village was 51.36% White, 7.94% African American, 0.48% Native American, 27.78% Asian, 0.05% Pacific Islander, 4.61% from other races, and 7.78% from two or more races. Hispanic or Latino of any race were 10.59% of the population.

There were 22,503 households, out of which 59.39% had children under the age of 18 living with them, 55.68% were married couples living together, 11.23% had a female householder with no husband present, and 27.98% were non-families. 25.48% of all households were made up of individuals, and 16.28% had someone living alone who was 65 years of age or older. The average household size was 3.37 and the average family size was 2.78.

The village's age distribution consisted of 23.3% under the age of 18, 6.7% from 18 to 24, 22.2% from 25 to 44, 27.6% from 45 to 64, and 20.0% who were 65 years of age or older. The median age was 42.9 years. For every 100 females, there were 89.0 males. For every 100 females age 18 and over, there were 85.5 males.

The median income for a household in the village was $74,725, and the median income for a family was $93,491. Males had a median income of $46,915 versus $37,025 for females. The per capita income for the village was $37,827. About 7.5% of families and 9.7% of the population were below the poverty line, including 12.9% of those under age 18 and 8.8% of those age 65 or over.

Note: the US Census treats Hispanic/Latino as an ethnic category. This table excludes Latinos from the racial categories and assigns them to a separate category. Hispanics/Latinos can be of any race.

Skokie is approximately 28% Jewish and has over a dozen synagogues.

Skokie also contains a sizeable Assyrian population. Some Assyrian American organizations, such as the Assyrian Universal Alliance Foundation, report that Assyrians make up the largest ethnic group in Skokie, with the population estimate being upwards of 20,000. The population of the local high school district, Niles Township High School District 219, is reported to be about 30% Assyrian, making them the largest ethnic group at the school district as well.

Economy
The village's AAA bond rating attests to strong economic health via prudent fiscal management. In 2003, Skokie became the first municipality in the United States to achieve nationally accredited police, fire, and public works departments, and a Class-1 fire department, per the Insurance Services Office (ISO) ratings. Likewise, in 2003 Money magazine named Skokie one of the 80 fastest-growing suburbs in the U.S.

Besides strong manufacturing and retail commerce bases, Skokie's economy will add health sciences jobs; in 2003, Forest City Enterprises announced their re-development of the vacant Pfizer research laboratories, in downtown Skokie, as the Illinois Science + Technology Park, a  campus of research installations— of chemistry, genomics, toxicology laboratories, clean rooms, NMR suites, conference rooms, etc.). In 2006, NorthShore University HealthSystem announced installing their consolidated data center operations at the park, adding 500 jobs to the economy. Map maker Rand McNally is also headquartered in Skokie.

Top employers
According to the Village's 2018 Comprehensive Annual Financial Report, the top employers in the village are:

Notable corporations
Peapod, online grocer
FelPro, now Federal-Mogul
Mayfair Games
Rand McNally
USRobotics
Bell & Howell
G.D. Searle, now Pfizer

Arts and culture
Westfield Old Orchard, an upscale shopping center, is one of the country's first and is the third largest mall by total square footage in Illinois. One of five in the Chicago area of the popular burger chain "Shake Shack" is located there. Additionally, shoppers have the option of eating at Epic Burger, along with multiple other restaurants in the mall.

The Skokie Northshore Sculpture Park is situated along the North Shore Channel between Dempster Street and Touhy Avenue on the east side of McCormick Boulevard. The first sculptures were built in the park in 1988 and it now has over 70 sculptures. Three areas are toured May through October of each year, on the last Sunday of the month with a presentation by a docent. Just north of the sculpture garden is a statue to Mahatma Gandhi with five of his famous quotations engraved around the base. This was dedicated on October 2, 2004.

In addition to municipally-managed public spaces, the village is also home to the North Shore Center for the Performing Arts, encompassing Centre East, Northlight Theatre and the Skokie Valley Symphony Orchestra. The facility celebrated its 20th anniversary in 2016.

The Illinois Holocaust Museum and Education Center opened in Skokie on April 19, 2009.

Library
On October 7, 2008, the Skokie Public Library received the 2008 National Medal for Museum and Library Service, notably for its cultural programming and multilingual services.

Parks and recreation

The Valley Line Trail is a multi-use trail connecting the northwest side of Chicago to the communities of Lincolnwood and Skokie.

Education

Public schools
Primary school districts include:
 Skokie School District 68
 Skokie/Morton Grove School District 69
 Fairview South School District 72
 East Prairie School District 73
 Skokie School District 73.5

Niles Township High School District 219 operates public high schools.

A portion of the city is served by the Evanston/Skokie School District 65 and Evanston Township High School.

High schools
 Niles North of District 219
 Niles West of District 219
 Niles Township District 219, known for its fine arts program, was awarded the Kennedy Center for Performing Arts Top program for fine arts education in the United States on April 27, 2007.
 Niles East High School closed in 1980 after community efforts to save the school failed.

Junior high schools
 Oliver McCracken Middle School (formerly Oakview Junior High) of District 73.5
 East Prairie School (Pre-K through 8th) of District 73
 Fairview South School of District 72
 Lincoln Junior High of District 69
 Old Orchard Junior High of District 68
 Chute Middle School in Evanston serves a small portion  of Skokie residents of Evanston/Skokie District 65

Elementary schools
See the same map as middle schools.
 Jane Stenson School, (K through 5th) of District 68
 Devonshire School, (K through 5th) of District 68
 Highland School, (K through 5th) of District 68
 Madison School, (pre-K through 2nd) of District 69
 Edison School, (3rd through 5th) of District 69
 Fairview North formerly of District 72
 Fairview South School, (K through 8th) of District 72
 Elizabeth Meyer School, (pre-K and K) of District 73.5
 John Middleton School, (1st through 5th) of District 73.5
 East Prairie School, (Pre-K through 8th) of District 73
 Walker Elementary School, (K through 5th) of Skokie/Evanston District 65
 Dr. Bessie Rhodes Magnet School, (K through 8th) of Skokie/Evanston District 65, formerly Timber Ridge Magnet School (may be attended by Skokie students in District 65)

Religious day schools
Jewish:
 Arie Crown Hebrew Day School (pre-K through 8th), boys and girls
 Cheder Lubavitch Hebrew Day School (pre-K through 8th), separate boys and girls programs
 Hillel Torah North Suburban Day School (pre-K through 8th), boys and girls
 Ida Crown Jewish Academy (9th through 12th), boys and girls
 Fasman Yeshiva High School (9th through 12th), boys only
 Solomon Schechter Day School Ginsburg Early Childhood Center. From 1978 to 2012 the day school had a campus in Skokie. After 2012 day students were moved to Northbrook, and the building is now MCC Academy's elementary school. The closure of the Skokie facility occurred as fewer Jewish people lived in Skokie.

Muslim:
 MCC Academy (Pre-K through elementary are in Skokie, with secondary students in Morton Grove)

Roman Catholic:
 St. Joan of Arc School (K-8), of the Roman Catholic Archdiocese of Chicago

Post-secondary education
 Oakton Community College (Ray Hartstein Campus) This is the site of the old Niles East High School. The original structure, built in the 1930s, was demolished in the 1990s.
 Hebrew Theological College, a private university. It was chartered in 1922 as one of the first Modern Orthodox Jewish institutions of higher education in America.
 National-Louis University has a campus near the Skokie Courthouse and is a high-ranking school for education.

Infrastructure

Public transportation
The Chicago "L"s Yellow Line terminates at the Dempster Street station in Skokie. Construction has been completed on a new Yellow Line train station at Oakton Street, to serve downtown Skokie and environs. It opened on April 30, 2012. Additionally, the CTA is commissioning an Alternative Analysis Study on the extension of the Yellow Line terminal to Old Orchard Road for Federal Transit Administration New Start grants.
The New Starts program allows federal funds to be used for capital projects provided that all solutions for a given problem (i.e., enabling easy transportation for reverse commuters to Old Orchard Mall) are considered. The solution recommended by the CTA is the elevation of the Yellow Line north of Searle Parkway to a rebuilt Dempster Street station, then following abandoned Union Pacific Railroad tracks and the east side of the Edens Expressway to a new terminal south of Old Orchard Road. Currently this solution needs to undergo public commenting as well as FTA and CTA board approval to continue.

Although the Yellow Line is the fastest transportation to and from the city, the village also is served by CTA and Pace bus routes. However, Greyhound Bus service to the Dempster Street train station has been discontinued. For automobile transport, Interstate 94, the Edens Expressway, traverses western Skokie, with interchanges at Touhy Avenue, Dempster Street, and Old Orchard Road.

Major highways
Major highways in Skokie include:

Interstate Highways
 Interstate 94

US Highways
 US 41

Illinois Highways
 Route 50
 Route 58

Notable people

Rob Ambrose, current head coach of Towson Tigers football team of Towson University
Louie Belpedio, NHL player for the Minnesota Wild
Mike Byster, mathematician, mental calculator and math educator
Jovita Carranza (born 1949), 26th Administrator of the Small Business Administration (2020–present). She is a past resident of Skokie.
Bobby Ciraldo, filmmaker and web-based artist
Bart Conner, Olympic gymnast, 1984 gold medalist
David Cromer,  theatre director and stage actor
Robert Feder, media blogger, former columnist for Chicago Sun-Times
Brenda A. Ferber, author of children's literature
Ken Goldstein, singer and author
Woody Goss, musician
Joel Pollak, politician and journalist
Nancy Lee Grahn, actress
Phil Handler (1908–1968), NFL football player and coach
Erin Heatherton, fashion model and actress
Amanda Jones, 1973 Miss USA
Shelly Kagan, philosopher
David Kaplan, columnist, radio and television personality
Jonathan Kite, actor and comedian
George Kotsiopoulos, magazine editor, fashion consultant, TV personality
Ken Kramer, former Congressman
Lou Lang, politician
Rashard Mendenhall, former running back in the National Football League
Abdel Nader, professional basketball player for the Oklahoma City Thunder of the National Basketball Association
Emily Naphtal, figure skater
Brent Novoselsky, NFL tight end
Noam Pikelny, banjo player, known for association with string quintet Punch Brothers
Esther Povitsky, standup comedian, actress and podcast host
Matt Reichel, politician
Eric Rosen, chess player and Twitch streamer
 Clarke Rosenberg (born 1993), American-Israeli basketball player in the Israel Basketball Premier League
Jessy Schram, actress
John Gideon Searle, businessman
Randy Suess, co-founder of CBBS, the first Bulletin Board System (BBS) ever brought online
Calvin Sutker, politician and lawyer
Azhar Usman, Indian-American Muslim standup comedian, actor, writer, and producer.

References

Further reading
When the Nazis Came to Skokie: Freedom for Speech We Hate, Philippa Strum, University Press of Kansas (31 Mar 1999), 
Skokie, 1888–1988: A centennial history, Richard Whittingham, Village of Skokie (1988),  ASIN B00071EORW
 Steven J. Heyman (ed.), Controversies in Constitutional Law: Hate Speech and the Constitution (New York and London: Garland Publishing Inc., 1996, Vol. II)
The industrialization of the Skokie area, James Byron Kenyon, University Of Chicago Press (1954), ASIN B0007DMRX8

External links 

 
 Brief history of Skokie

 
Villages in Illinois
Jewish communities in the United States
Jews and Judaism in Chicago
Chicago metropolitan area
Villages in Cook County, Illinois
Populated places established in 1888
1888 establishments in Illinois
Majority-minority cities and towns in Cook County, Illinois